Alert is an energy caffeine gum produced by the Wrigley's company that entered the U.S. market in April 2013.

Sales and marketing
Sales are aimed at adults 25 and older who want a portable energy product. An eight-piece pack of Alert retails for $2.99 (U.S.).

Taste
The gum is remarkable for a bitter, medicinal taste.

Caffeine
According to the company, one piece of gum contains the same amount of caffeine as half a cup of coffee, which is about 40 milligrams.

FDA investigation
Wrigley temporarily halted production and sales of its Alert energy gum as the Food and Drug Administration (FDA) investigates the safety of caffeinated-food products, especially the possible effects of caffeinated gum on children and adolescents.

References

Products introduced in 2013
Caffeine
Chewing gum
Wrigley Company brands